Paula Brooks is a fictional comic book character published by DC Comics. She is one of many characters to use the names Tigress and Huntress. Paula Brooks is the wife of Sportsmaster and the mother of Artemis Crock.

Paula Brooks appeared as Tigress on the DC Universe streaming service show Stargirl played by Joy Osmanski. The show also appeared on The CW Network.

Publication history
Brooks first appeared in Sensation Comics #68 as the Huntress where she was created by artist Mort Meskin and an uncredited writer. Later, it is retroactively revealed that she was a heroine named the Tigress before becoming a criminal where this alias was created by Roy Thomas.

Fictional character biography

Pre-Crisis
Prior to the Crisis on Infinite Earths, she battles Helena Wayne (who had become the new Huntress) and is defeated.

During this time, an Earth-1 Huntress and Sportsmaster are revealed. They fight Batgirl and Robin in Batman Family and then challenge the Earth-1 superheroes to a baseball game between heroes and villains. When the heroes win, the Earth-1 Huntress and Sportsmaster reform and are not seen again.

After the Crisis on Infinite Earths, the Earth-1 pair cease to exist and the Golden Age versions become the dominant version in the new unified universe.

She never uses the Tigress name or her real name (Paula Brooks) during her Pre-Crisis adventures.

Post-Crisis
In the pages of Young All-Stars she was retroactively renamed the Tigress. These stories took place prior to her villainous career as the Huntress.

At this point, the young Paula Brooks (approximately age 18-19) is a superheroine, and fights both Nazis and criminals alongside Iron Munro, the first Fury, Neptune Perkins, Tsunami and Dan the Dyna-Mite. During these stories, Paula expresses a fan worship of Paul Kirk, the Manhunter. She frequently makes a play for Iron Munro as well. During a battle with the Nazi warriors known as Axis Amerika, Tigress is attacked and seemingly killed by the Valkyrie known as Gudra. She was revived (it is unclear if she really was actually dead) with a new attitude, which eventually leads to her becoming the villainous Huntress. In the late 1990s JSA Returns mini-series, Tigress has yet to fully embrace her villainous attitude and was still operating as a heroine and companion of Manhunter.

Upon donning a tiger-skin costume and becoming Huntress years later, Paula Brooks tracked down Wildcat and trapped him in her private zoo as part of her plan to capture people who would throw people in prison. Wildcat became the first person she caught to break out.

Huntress returned where she plotted to capture Ted Grant and replace him with a double so that she would bet on his opponent and get money when the double lost. When Huntress captured "Stretch" Skinner, she drew the attention of Wildcat. Huntress and Wildcat fought to a draw as Wildcat and Skinner escaped her ship. When Ted won his bout, a disguised Huntress watched the match and later slipped away.

Due to her reputation of fighting Wildcat, Huntress was invited to join the Injustice Society. In a competition to see who would lead the group, Huntress managed to steal Plymouth Rock and nearly defeated Atom and Flash.

Huntress and her men kidnapped Ted Grant and his opponent Mike Baily and held them for ransom. Ted broke out of his trap, became Wildcat, and brought Tigress to justice.

In 1949, Huntress and Sportsmaster rejoined the Injustice Society where they captured the members of the Justice Society. Some of its former members like Wildcat united to rescue them and defeat the Injustice Society.

They fight Black Canary and Starman in the 1960s, as well as continuing to serve as members of the Injustice Society.

Huntress and Sportsmaster later got engaged and had a daughter named Artemis who took part in the family business. Artemis worked to free her parents from Empire State Detention Center only to be thrown into a wall by Solomon Grundy who was protecting Jade. When Wildcat was poisoned during the Justice Society's next fight with the Injustice Society, Huntress fought her own daughter. As Wildcat is dying from the poison, the Justice Society works to come up with an antidote while fighting Tigress, Sportsmaster, and Thorn.

Paula Brooks is later seen out of uniform in Young Justice at an Olympics-type event where her daughter Artemis competes on behalf of Zandia, a country that harbors super-villains.

DC Universe
In 2016, DC Comics implemented another relaunch of its books called "DC Rebirth", which restored its continuity to a form much as it was prior to "The New 52". When Hawkman and Hawkgirl recount their time with the Justice Society and the day that they fought the Injustice Society, Tigress was seen as a member of the Injustice Society. Wildcat was the one who faced off against Tigress and defeated her.

Powers and abilities
Brooks has no powers or unusual technology, but she did utilize various types of wild beasts in committing her crimes. She is also a skilled hand-to-hand fighter whose nails were once sharpened like talons.

She also used a small crossbow and a steady supply of crossbow bolts. She has also been known to use throwing nets and bolos to trap her prey.

Other versions
Outside of regular DCU continuity, James Robinson and Paul Smith feature the Tigress the 1993 The Golden Age. mini-series. In August 1948, Paula Brooks is granted amnesty for her crimes in return for her allegiance to Tex Thompson's newly created anti-communism force. After learning that Thompson is actually the ruthless Ultra-Humanite Brooks joins other heroes on January 8, 1950 in opposing him and his allies. Traumatized by the deaths of her lover, Lance Gallant, and friends such as Miss America and the Sportsmaster in the ensuing conflict, Paula returns to crime. By 1955, she is reported to have "made the F.B.I.'s most wanted list".

In other media

Television
 Paula Brooks / Tigress makes a cameo appearance in the Batman: The Brave and the Bold episode "Aquaman's Outrageous Adventure!"
 A Vietnamese character inspired by Paula Brooks named Paula Nguyen appears in Young Justice, voiced by Kelly Hu. Introduced in the episode "Downtime", she had previously operated as Huntress before she was confined to a wheelchair. Nguyen lives with her younger daughter, Artemis Crock, in a rundown apartment in Gotham City, and is aware of her eldest daughter Jade Nguyen's activities as an assassin.
 The mother of Evelyn Crawford Sharp / Artemis appears in the fourth season of Arrow as an unnamed woman who became involved with Damien Darhk and his syndicate H.I.V.E. The Green Arrow and his team find Sharp's parents, but are unable to save them before they died of hypoxia and Malcolm Merlyn destroys the facility. The parents' bodies are later recovered from the wreckage.
 Paula Brooks / Tigress appears in Stargirl, portrayed by Joy Osmanski. This version is a member of the Injustice Society of America (ISA) who works as Blue Valley High School's gym teacher. In the pilot episode, she joined the ISA in attacking the Justice Society of America (JSA) before reluctantly going into retirement. In "The Justice Society", Brooks and Sportsmaster come out of retirement to overpower Stargirl and her friends when they attempt to intercept an ISA operation, only to be driven off by S.T.R.I.P.E. In the two-part season one finale, "Stars and S.T.R.I.P.E.", Brooks and Sportsmaster assist the ISA in enacting Project: New America, only to be foiled by Stargirl's JSA. In "Summer School: Chapter Thirteen", Artemis Crock breaks Brooks and Sportsmaster out of prison so they can help Cindy Burman and the JSA fight Eclipso. Following this, the Crock family move in next door to the Whitmore-Dugan family at the end of season two. In season three, Brooks and Sportsmaster work with the JSA to investigate Gambler's death and find the person responsible for spying on Blue Valley's citizens until they are killed by Icicle.

Miscellaneous
Paula Brooks / Tigress makes a cameo appearance in the DC Super Hero Girls episode "Welcome to Super Hero High".

Reception
Michael Eury and Gina Misiroglu characterized the original Huntress Paula Brooks as "a relatively obscure Golden Age villainess", whose title was borrowed for the character of Helena Wayne.

Sophie Bonadè found that Paula Brooks, like a number of villainesses of the time, falls under the "Dating Catwoman" cliché of being in a romantic relation to the hero she fights.

See also
 Huntress (DC Comics)
 Tigress (DC Comics)

References

External links
Comic Book Database: Huntress I
Comic Book Database: Tigress II
Cosmic Team Profile: Huntress I
Cosmic Team Profile: Tigress II
Golden Age Villain Checklist
Obscure Characters: Huntress I/Tigress II
The Unofficial Tigress II Biography
The Unofficial Huntress I Biography
 Who's Who in the DC Universe

Golden Age superheroes
Comics characters introduced in 1947
DC Comics martial artists
Earth-Two
DC Comics female superheroes
DC Comics female supervillains
Fictional characters from parallel universes
Fictional hunters in comics
Characters created by Roy Thomas
Golden Age supervillains